The 1930 World Table Tennis Championships – Swaythling Cup (men's team) was the fourth edition of the men's team championship.  

Hungary won the gold medal following a perfect 9-0 match record.

Swaythling Cup final table

See also
List of World Table Tennis Championships medalists

References

-